Christopher Paul Maier is an American government official who is the Assistant Secretary of Defense for Special Operations and Low-Intensity Conflict. He previously served as the Principal Assistant Secretary of Defense for Special Operations and Low-Intensity Conflict.

Early life and education

Maier earned degrees from the University of California, Berkeley and The Fletcher School at Tufts University.

Military career

He serves as an officer in the Air National Guard.

Government service

Maier began his government career as an intelligence analyst on Middle East and Africa issues. From March 2017 to November 2020 he led the Defeat-ISIS Task Force charged with integrating Department of Defense efforts in the campaign to achieve the enduring defeat of ISIS, until he was asked to resign by the Trump administration after the 2020 United States presidential election. Maier was appointed as the Deputy Assistant Secretary of Defense for Special Operations and Combating Terrorism in the Obama administration. He previously served in different positions within the National Counterterrorism Center, including Senior Advisor to the Director, Chief of Strategic Assessments and Regional Planning, and Chief of Staff in the Directorate of Strategic Operational Planning. Maier was detailed from 2009 to 2013 to the National Security Council staff, where he authored the 2011 National Strategy for Counterterrorism.

Nomination as Assistant Secretary of Defense 

In January 2021, it was reported that Maier would be brought back by the Biden administration as the acting principal deputy assistant secretary of defense for special operations and low-intensity conflict. On April 23, 2021, President Joe Biden announced Maier as his nominee to be the Assistant Secretary of Defense for Special Operations and Low-Intensity Conflict. He testified before the Senate Committee on Armed Services on May 27, 2021, and was confirmed by voice vote of the full Senate on August 7, 2021. He assumed office on August 12, 2021.

References

External links

Official Biography at the Department of Defense

Year of birth missing (living people)
Living people
Place of birth missing (living people)
University of California, Berkeley alumni
United States Air Force officers
The Fletcher School at Tufts University alumni
United States National Security Council staffers
United States Assistant Secretaries of Defense
Biden administration personnel